The 10th César Awards ceremony, presented by the Académie des Arts et Techniques du Cinéma, honoured the best French films of 1984 and took place on 3 February 1985 at the Théâtre de l'Empire in Paris. The ceremony was chaired by Simone Signoret and hosted by Pierre Tchernia. My New Partner won the award for Best Film.

Winners and nominees
The winners are highlighted in bold:

Best Film:My New Partner, directed by Claude ZidiL'amour à mort, directed by Alain ResnaisCarmen, directed by Francesco RosiLes Nuits de la pleine lune, directed by Éric RohmerUn dimanche à la campagne, directed by Bertrand Tavernier
Best Foreign Film: Amadeus, directed by Miloš FormanGreystoke: The Legend of Tarzan, Lord of the Apes, directed by Hugh HudsonMaria's Lovers, directed by Andrei KonchalovskyParis, Texas, directed by Wim Wenders 
Best First Work: La Diagonale du fou, directed by Richard DemboBoy Meets Girl, directed by Leos CaraxMarche à l'ombre, directed by Michel BlancSouvenirs souvenirs, directed by Ariel Zeitoun 
Best Actor:Alain Delon, for Notre histoireMichel Piccoli, for La Diagonale du fouGérard Depardieu, for Fort SagannePhilippe Noiret, for Les RipouxLouis Ducreux, for Un dimanche à la campagne  
Best Actress:Sabine Azéma, for Un dimanche à la campagneJulia Migenes, for CarmenValérie Kaprisky, for La femme publique Pascale Ogier, for Les Nuits de la pleine lune Jane Birkin, for La Pirate
Best Supporting Actor:Richard Bohringer, for L'Addition Lambert Wilson, for La femme publiqueFabrice Luchini, for Les Nuits de la pleine luneBernard-Pierre Donnadieu, for Rue barbareMichel Aumont, for Un dimanche à la campagne
Best Supporting Actress:Caroline Cellier, for L'Année des médusesÉlisabeth Bourgine, for La 7ème cible Victoria Abril, for L'AdditionMaruschka Detmers, for La PirateCarole Bouquet, for Rive droite, rive gauche
Most Promising Actor: Pierre-Loup Rajot, for Souvenirs souvenirs Hippolyte Girardot, for Le Bon plaisirBenoît Régent, for La Diagonale du fouXavier Deluc, for La Triche
Most Promising Actress: Laure Marsac, for La PirateSophie Duez, for Marche à l'ombreFanny Bastien, for Pinot simple flicEmmanuelle Béart, for Un amour interdit 
Best Director:Claude Zidi, for Les RipouxAlain Resnais, for L'amour à mortFrancesco Rosi, for CarmenÉric Rohmer, for Les Nuits de la pleine luneBertrand Tavernier, for Un dimanche à la campagne 
Best Writing – Original: Bertrand Blier, for Notre histoireÉric Rohmer, for Les Nuits de la pleine luneClaude Zidi, for Les Ripoux
Best Writing – Adaptation: Bertrand Tavernier, Colo Tavernier, for Un dimanche à la campagneFrançoise Giroud, Francis Girod, for Le Bon plaisirAndrzej Żuławski, Dominique Garnier, for La femme publique 
Best Cinematography: Bruno de Keyzer, for Un dimanche à la campagneSacha Vierny, for L'amour à mortPasqualino De Santis, for CarmenBruno Nuytten, for Fort Saganne  
Best Costume Design: Yvonne Sassinot de Nesle, for Un amour de SwannEnrico Job, for CarmenRosine Delamare, Corinne Jorry, for Fort Saganne 
Best Sound:Dominique Hennequin, Guy Level, Harald Maury, for CarmenPierre Gamet, Jacques Maumont, for L'amour à mortJean-Paul Loublier, Claude Villand, Pierre Gamet, for Fort SaganneClaude Villand, Bernard Leroux, Guillaume Sciama, for Souvenirs souvenirs  
Best Editing:Nicole Saunier, for Les RipouxClaudine Merlin, for Notre histoireGeneviève Winding, for Souvenirs souvenirsArmand Psen, for Un dimanche à la campagne 
Best Music: Michel Portal, for Les Cavaliers de l'orage Hans Werner Henze, for L'amour à mortMichel Legrand, for Paroles et musiqueBernard Lavilliers, for Rue barbare
Best Production Design: Jacques Saulnier, for Un amour de SwannEnrico Job, for CarmenJean-Jacques Caziot, for Les Cavaliers de l'orageBernard Evein, for Notre histoire
Best Animated Short:La Boule, directed by Alain UghettoL'Invité, directed by Guy JacquesRa, directed by Pierre Jamin, Thierry Barthes 
Best Fiction Short:Première classe, directed by Mehdi El GlaouiLa Combine de la girafe,  directed by Thomas GilouHomicide by Night directed by Gérard KrawczykOiseau de sang directed by Frédéric RippertPremiers mètres directed by Pierre Levy
Best Documentary Short:La Nuit du hibou, directed by François DupeyronHommage à Dürer directed by Gérard SamsonL'Écuelle et l'assiette,  directed by Raoul Rossi
Best French Language Film:Wend Kuuni, directed by Gaston Kaboré 
Honorary César:Christian-JaqueDanielle DarrieuxChristine Gouze-RénalAlain Poiré

See also
 57th Academy Awards
 38th British Academy Film Awards

References

External links
 Official website
 
 10th César Awards at AlloCiné

1985
1985 film awards
Cesar